Hoyt is a city in Jackson County, Kansas, United States.  As of the 2020 census, the population of the city was 593.

History
Hoyt was founded in 1886. It was named for George Henry Hoyt, an abolitionist and attorney for John Brown.

Geography
Hoyt is located at  (39.248709, -95.705375).

Climate
The climate in this area is characterized by hot, humid summers and generally mild to cool winters.  According to the Köppen Climate Classification system, Hoyt has a humid subtropical climate, abbreviated "Cfa" on climate maps.

Demographics

Hoyt is part of the Topeka, Kansas Metropolitan Statistical Area.

2010 census
As of the census of 2010, there were 669 people, 253 households, and 184 families residing in the city. The racial makeup of the city was 85.5% White, 0.1% African American, 9.6% Native American, 1.2% Asian, 0.9% from other races, and 2.7% from two or more races. Hispanic or Latino of any race were 5.1% of the population.

There were 253 households, of which 41.9% had children under the age of 18 living with them, 51.0% were married couples living together, 15.8% had a female householder with no husband present, 5.9% had a male householder with no wife present, and 27.3% were non-families. 23.7% of all households were made up of individuals, and 9.1% had someone living alone who was 65 years of age or older. The average household size was 2.64 and the average family size was 3.10.

The median age in the city was 34 years. 30.8% of residents were under the age of 18; 7.9% were between the ages of 18 and 24; 29.6% were from 25 to 44; 21.4% were from 45 to 64; and 10.3% were 65 years of age or older. The gender makeup of the city was 49.2% male and 50.8% female.

2000 census
As of the census of 2000, there were 571 people, 206 households, and 156 families residing in the city. The racial makeup of the city was 94.05% White, 2.98% Native American, 0.53% Asian, 0.70% from other races, and 1.75% from two or more races. Hispanic or Latino of any race were 2.63% of the population.

There were 206 households, out of which 42.2% had children under the age of 18 living with them, 60.7% were married couples living together, 9.2% had a female householder with no husband present, and 23.8% were non-families. 20.4% of all households were made up of individuals, and 8.7% had someone living alone who was 65 years of age or older. The average household size was 2.77 and the average family size was 3.18.

In the city, the population was spread out, with 32.2% under the age of 18, 7.2% from 18 to 24, 31.3% from 25 to 44, 17.7% from 45 to 64, and 11.6% who were 65 years of age or older. The median age was 31 years. For every 100 females, there were 99.7 males. For every 100 females age 18 and over, there were 99.5 males.

The median income for a household in the city was $46,806, and the median income for a family was $46,806. Males had a median income of $35,188 versus $22,750 for females. The per capita income for the city was $15,116. About 4.2% of families and 7.4% of the population were below the poverty line, including 12.3% of those under age 18 and none of those age 65 or over.

Education
The community is served by Royal Valley USD 337 public school district, and Royal Valley High School.

References

Further reading

 Living in the Depot: The Two-Story Railroad Station; H. Roger Grant; University of Iowa Press; 130 pages; 1993; .  Contains historic images of Kansas stations at Alta Vista, Bucklin, Comiskey, Haddam, Hoyt, and Wakarusa.

External links

 Hoyt - Directory of Public Officials
 USD 337, local school district
 Hoyt city map, KDOT

Cities in Kansas
Cities in Jackson County, Kansas
Topeka metropolitan area, Kansas